Raymond Westwell (6 January 1919 – 23 November 1982) was a British actor and director who worked for many years in Australia. He made his Australian TV debut in The Angry General. He worked as a director of theatre, notably Camelot.

Select Credits
The Angry General (1964)
Romanoff and Juliet (1965)
A Time to Speak (1965)
Daphne Laureola (1965)
Cross of Gold (1965)
Photo Finish (1965)
Othello (1965)
The Third Witness (1966)
Antigone (1966)
V.I.P.P. (1966)
Point of Departure (1966)
The Five Sided Triangle (1967)
Die Fledermaus (1967)

References

External links
Raymond Westwell at IMDb
Raymond Westwell at Theatricalia
Raymond Westwell's Australian theatre credits at AusStage

1919 births
1982 deaths
British actors
British expatriates in Australia